The Swinburn–Henry rifle was a breech-loading lever-actuated single-shot rifle that was used by British Commonwealth forces in the late 1870s as substitute for the Martini–Henry, which was at the time in short supply.

Design
The Swinburn–Henry had the same barrel as the Martini–Henry with Henry pattern 7-groove polygonal with ribbed angles & right hand twist rifling.  The Swinburn–Henry also bore a striking resemblance to the Martini–Henry, but internally the two were quite distinct.  Both rifles were breech-loading falling block single shot rifles, with a cocking under lever opening the breech of the weapon to load a round into the chamber, but the Swinburn–Henry employed a V spring and hammer to strike the firing pin and the Swinburn–Henry’s butt was attached to the receiver by means of an upper and a lower tang instead of a sturdy axial bolt.

The most noticeable difference between the Swinburn–Henry and the Martini–Henry was the former had a thumb operated side lever which allowed the hammer to be cocked without operating the under lever, unlike the Martini–Henry.  In practice this proved to be a major advantage for the Swinburn–Henry over Martini–Henry, as the former could be carried cocked in a saddle bag without risk of it discharging by itself.

The greatest advantage of the Swinburn–Henry design was it fired the same .577/450 Martini–Henry cartridge as the Martini–Henry. The Swinburn design was distinct enough from the Martini design to circumvent the Martini patent that was at the time in force, but in practice the action proved to be more fragile and more prone to stoppages than the Martini action.

Rifle
The rifle was typically issued to infantry, it was often supplied with commercially manufactured 1875 Pattern sword bayonets, although Pattern 1871 cutlass bayonets were used with the rifles by naval volunteers.

Carbine
The carbine was typically issued to mounted troops and police and some were supplied with a Bowie knife bayonet, although in service these bayonets proved to be ineffectual.

History

The Swinburn–Henry was designed by J. S. Swinburn of Swinburn & Son, Birmingham and patented in 1872, all production was carried out by Abingdon Works Co. Ltd., Birmingham.

The Swinburn–Henry was used extensively by the volunteer forces of the Colony of Natal. It is unknown exactly how many were purchased, but deliveries commenced in 1875 and by 1878 the colony had received 2,040 carbines and 1,150 rifles along with 190 Bowie knife carbine bayonets and an unknown quantity of sword bayonets. The carbines were issued to the mounted units and the rifles to the infantry, the Swinburn–Henry was also issued to the Natal Mounted Police and naval volunteers.

The Swinburn–Henry was used by Natal’s forces during the Anglo-Zulu War, the carbine in particular saw broad service in the early years of the conflict. Both the rifle and the carbine were eventually replaced by the Martini–Henry.

See also
 Farquharson rifle

References

Rifles of the United Kingdom
Single-shot rifles
Victorian-era weapons of the United Kingdom